Xystrocera globosa is a species of beetle in the family Cerambycidae. It was described by Olivier in 1795. It is distributed widely across tropical Asia. It has also become established in Hawaii and the Mediterranean region and is found in Egypt and Israel as well.

References

Cerambycinae
Beetles described in 1795